Gep Landaal (2 December 1899 – 1 July 1975) was a Dutch footballer. He played in eight matches for the Netherlands national football team from 1929 to 1930.

References

External links
 

1899 births
1975 deaths
Dutch footballers
Netherlands international footballers
Place of birth missing
Association footballers not categorized by position